Parmenides is one of the dialogues of Plato. It is widely considered to be one of the most challenging and enigmatic of Plato's dialogues.
The Parmenides purports to be an account of a meeting between the two great philosophers of the Eleatic school, Parmenides and Zeno of Elea, and a young Socrates. The occasion of the meeting was the reading by Zeno of his treatise defending Parmenidean monism against those partisans of plurality who asserted that Parmenides' supposition that there is a one gives rise to intolerable absurdities and contradictions. The dialogue is set during a supposed meeting between Parmenides and Zeno of Elea in Socrates' hometown of Athens. This dialogue is chronologically the earliest of all as Socrates is only nineteen years old here. It is also notable that he takes the position of the student here while Parmenides serves as the lecturer. 

The dialogue is likely fictitious.

Discussion with Socrates
The heart of the dialogue opens with a challenge by Socrates to the elder and revered Parmenides and Zeno. Employing his customary method of attack, the reductio ad absurdum, Zeno has argued that if as the pluralists say things are many, then they will be both like and unlike; but this is an impossible situation, for unlike things cannot be like, nor like things unlike. But this difficulty vanishes, says Socrates, if we are prepared to make the distinction between sensibles on one hand and Forms, in which sensibles participate, on the other. Thus one and the same thing can be both like and unlike, or one and many, by participating in the Forms of Likeness and Unlikeness, of Unity and Plurality; I am one man, and as such partake of the Form of Unity, but I also have many parts and in this respect I partake of the Form of Plurality. There is no problem in demonstrating that sensible things may have opposite attributes; what would cause consternation, and earn the admiration of Socrates, would be if someone were to show that the Forms themselves were capable of admitting contrary predicates.

At this point, Parmenides takes over as Socrates' interlocutor and dominates the remainder of the dialogue. After establishing that Socrates himself has made the distinction between Forms and sensibles, Parmenides asks him what sorts of Form he is prepared to recognize. Socrates replies that he has no doubt about the existence of mathematical, ethical and aesthetic Forms (e.g., Unity, Plurality, Goodness, Beauty), but is unsure of Forms of Man, Fire and Water; he is almost certain, though admits to some reservations, that undignified objects like hair, mud and dirt do not have Forms. Parmenides suggests that when he is older and more committed to philosophy, he will consider all the consequences of his theory, even regarding seemingly insignificant objects like hair and mud.

For the remainder of the first part of the dialogue, Parmenides draws Socrates out on certain aspects of the Theory of Forms and in the process brings to bear five arguments against the theory.

Argument 1. (130e–131e) If particular things come to partake of the Form of Beauty or Likeness or Largeness they thereby become beautiful or like or large. Parmenides presses Socrates on how precisely many particulars can participate in a single Form. On one hand, if the Form as a whole is present in each of its many instances, then it would as a whole be in numerically different places, and thus separate from itself. Socrates suggests that the Form might be like a day, and thus present in many things at once. Parmenides counters that this would be little different from a single sail covering a number of people, wherein different parts touch different individuals; consequently, the Form is many.

Argument 2. (132a–b) Socrates' reason for believing in the existence of a single Form in each case is that when he views a number of (say) large things, there appears to be a single character which they all share, viz. the character of Largeness. But considering the series of large things; x, y, z, Largeness itself, the latter is also in some sense considered to be large, and if all members of this series partake of a single Form, then there must be another Largeness in which large things and the first Form of Largeness partake. But if this second Form of Largeness is also large, then there should be a third Form of Largeness over the large things and the first two Forms, and so on ad infinitum. Hence, instead of there being one Form in every case, we are confronted with an indefinite number. This Largeness regress is commonly known under the name given to it by Aristotle, the famous Third Man Argument (TMA).

Argument 3. (132b–c) To the suggestion that each Form is a thought existing in a soul, thus maintaining the unity of the Form, Parmenides replies that a thought must be a thought of something that is a Form. Thus we still have to explain the participation relation. Further, if things share in Forms which are no more than thoughts, then either things consist of thoughts and think, or else they are thoughts, yet do not think.

Argument 4. (132c–133a) Socrates now suggests that the Forms are patterns in nature (παραδείγματα paradeigmata "paradigms") of which the many instances are copies or likenesses. Parmenides argues that if the many instances are like the Forms, then the Forms are like their instances. Yet if things are like, then they come to be like by participating in Likeness; therefore Likeness is like the likeness in concrete things, and another regress is generated.

Argument 5. (133a–134e) Called the "great difficulty [ἀπορία]" (133a) by Parmenides, the theory of Forms arises as a consequence of the assertion of the separate existence of the Forms. Forms do not exist in our world but have their being with reference to one another in their own world. Similarly, things of our world are related among themselves, but not to Forms. Just as Mastership has its being relative to Slavery, so mastership in our world has its being relative to slavery in our world. No terrestrial master is master of Slave itself, and no terrestrial master-slave relation has any relationship to the ideal Master-Slave relation. And so it is with knowledge. All our knowledge is such with respect to our world, not to the world of the Forms, while ideal Knowledge is knowledge of the things not of our world but of the world of the Forms. Hence, we cannot know the Forms. What is more, the gods who dwell in the divine world, can have no knowledge of us, and nor can their ideal mastership rule us.

In spite of Socrates' inability to defend the theory against Parmenides' arguments, in the following transitional section of the dialogue Parmenides himself appears to advocate the theory. He insists that without Forms there can be no possibility of dialectic, and that Socrates was unable to uphold the theory because he has been insufficiently exercised. There follows a description of the kind of exercise, or training, that Parmenides recommends.

The remainder of the dialogue is taken up with an actual performance of such an exercise, where a young Aristoteles (later a member of the Thirty Tyrants, not to be confused with Plato's eventual student Aristotle), takes the place of Socrates as Parmenides' interlocutor.

Discussion with Aristoteles
This difficult second part of the dialogue is generally agreed to be one of the most challenging, and sometimes bizarre, pieces in the whole of the Platonic corpus. It consists of an unrelenting series of difficult and subtle arguments, where the exchange is stripped of all but the bare essentials of the arguments involved. Gone are the drama and colour we are accustomed to from earlier dialogues.

The second part of the dialogue can be divided thus:

Hypothesis/Deduction n. 1 (137c-142a): If it is one. The one cannot be made up of parts, because then the one would be made of many. Nor can it be a whole, because wholes are made of parts. Thus the one has no parts and is not a whole. It has not a beginning, a middle nor an end because these are parts, it is therefore unlimited. It has no shape because it is neither linear nor circular: a circle has parts all equidistant from the centre, but the one has no parts nor a centre; It is not a line because a line has a middle and two extremes, which the one cannot have. Thus the one has no shape. The one cannot be in anything nor in itself. If it was in another it would be all surrounded and by what it is inside and would be touched at many parts by what contains it, but the one has no parts and thus cannot be inside something else. If it were in itself it would contain itself, but if it is contained then it is different from what contains it and thus the one would be two. The one cannot move because movement is change or change in position. It cannot change because it has no parts to change. If it moves position it moves either circularly or linearly. If it spins in place its outer part revolves around its middle but the one has neither. If it moves its position it moves through something else, which it cannot be inside. Thus the one does not move. The one must be itself and cannot be different from it. The one does not take part in the flowing of time so it is imperishable.

Hypothesis/Deduction n. 2 (142b–155e): If the one is. The one is, it must be and it is part of being. The one is part of being and vice versa. Being is a part of the one, the one is a whole that is a group of sections. The one does not participate in the being, so it must be a single part. Being is unlimited and is contained in everything, however big or small it is. So, since the one is part of being, it is divided into as many parts as being, thus it is unfinished. The parts are themselves sections of a whole, the whole is delimited, confirming the presence of a beginning, a centre, and an end. Therefore, since the centre is itself at the same distance from the beginning and the end, the one must have a form: linear, spherical, or mixed. If the whole is in some of its parts, it will be the plus into the minus, and different from itself. The one is also elsewhere, it is stationary and in movement at the same time.

The Appendix to the First Two Deductions 155e–157b

Hypothesis/Deduction n. 3 (157b–159b): If the one is not. If the one is not it participates in everything different from it, so everything is partially one. Similarity, dissimilarity, bigness, equality and smallness belong to it since the one is similar to itself but dissimilar to anything that is, but it can be big or small as regards dissimilarity and equal as concerns similarity. So the one participates of non-being and also of being because you can think of it. Therefore, the one becomes and perishes and, since it participates of non-being, stays. The one removes from itself the contraries so that it is unnameable, not disputable, not knowable or sensible or showable. The other things appear one and many, limited and unlimited, similar and dissimilar, the same and completely different, in movement and stationary, and neither the first nor the latter thing since they are different from the one and other things. Eventually they are not. So if the one is not, being is not.

A satisfactory characterisation of this part of the dialogue has eluded scholars since antiquity. Many thinkers have tried, among them Cornford, Russell, Ryle, and Owen; but few would accept without hesitation any of their characterisations as having got to the heart of the matter. Recent interpretations of the second part have been provided by Miller (1986), Meinwald (1991), Sayre (1996), Allen (1997), Turnbull (1998), Scolnicov (2003), and Rickless (2007). It is difficult to offer even a preliminary characterisation, since commentators disagree even on some of the more rudimentary features of any interpretation. Benjamin Jowett did maintain in the introduction to his translation of the book that the dialogue was certainly not a Platonic refutation of the Eleatic doctrine. In fact, it could well be an Eleatic assessment of the theory of Forms. It might even mean that the Eleatic monist doctrine wins over the pluralistic contention of Plato. The discussion, at the very least, concerns itself with topics close to Plato's heart in many of the later dialogues, such as Being, Sameness, Difference, and Unity; but any attempt to extract a moral from these passages invites contention.

The structure of the remainder of the dialogue:

The Fourth Deduction 159b–160b

The Fifth Deduction 160b–163b

The Sixth Deduction 163b–164b

The Seventh Deduction 164b–165e

The Eighth Deduction 165e–166c

Third man argument
Plato's theory of Forms, as it is presented in such dialogues as the Phaedo, Republic and the first part of the Parmenides, seems committed to the following principles:  "F" stands for any Form ("appearance, property")—forma is a Boethian translation for εἶδος (eidos), which is the word that Plato used. Plato, in the Parmenides, uses the example "greatness" (μέγεθος) for "F-ness"; Aristotle uses the example "man".

One-over-many: For any plurality of F things, there is a form of F-ness by virtue of partaking of which each member of that plurality is F.
Self-predication: Every form of F-ness is itself F.
Non-self-partaking: No form partakes of itself.
Uniqueness: For any property F, there is exactly one form of F-ness.
Purity: No form can have contrary properties.
One/many: The property of being one and the property of being many are contraries.
Oneness: Every form is one.

However, the TMA shows that these principles are mutually contradictory, as long as there is a plurality of things that are F:

(In what follows, μέγας [megas; "great"] is used as an example; however, the argumentation holds for any F.)

Begin, then, with the assumption that there is a plurality of great things, say (A, B, C). By one-over-many, there is a form of greatness (say, G1) by virtue of partaking of which A, B, and C are great. By self-predication, G1 is great. 

But then we can add G1 to (A, B, C) to form a new plurality of great things: (A, B, C, G1). By one-over-many, there is a form of greatness (say, G2) by virtue of partaking of which A, B, C, and G1 are great. But in that case G1 partakes of G2, and by Non-Self-Partaking, G1 is not identical to G2. So there are at least two forms of greatness, G1 and G2. This already contradicts Uniqueness, according to which there is exactly one (and hence no more than one) form of greatness.

But it gets worse for the theory of Forms. For by Self-Predication, G2 is great, and hence G2 can be added to (A, B, C, G1) to form a new plurality of great things: (A, B, C, G1, G2). By One-Over-Many, there is a form of greatness (say, G3) by virtue of partaking of which A, B, C, G1, and G2 are great. But in that case G1 and G2 both partake of G3, and by Non-Self-Partaking, neither of G1 and G2 is identical to G3. So there must be at least three forms of greatness, G1, G2, and G3.

Repetition of this reasoning shows that there is an infinite hierarchy of forms of greatness, with each form partaking of the infinite number of forms above it in the hierarchy. According to Plato, anything that partakes of many things must itself be many. So each form in the infinite hierarchy of forms of greatness is many. But then, given Purity and One/Many, it follows that each form in the infinite hierarchy of forms of greatness is not one. This contradicts Oneness.

Legacy
The third man argument was furthered by Aristotle (Metaphysics 990b17–1079a13, 1039a2; Sophistic Refutations 178b36 ff.) who, rather than using the example of "greatness" (μέγεθος), used the example of a man (hence the name of the argument) to explain this objection to the theory, which he attributes to Plato; Aristotle posits that if a man is a man because he partakes in the form of man, then a third form would be required to explain how man and the form of man are both man, and so on, ad infinitum.

Ancient commentaries

The Parmenides was the frequent subject of commentaries by Neoplatonists. Important examples include those of Proclus and of Damascius, and an anonymous 3rd or 4th commentary possibly due to Porphyry. The 13th century translation of Proclus' commentary by Dominican friar William of Moerbeke stirred subsequent medieval interest (Klibansky, 1941). In the 15th century, Proclus' commentary influenced the philosophy of Nicolas of Cusa, and Neoplatonists Giovanni Pico della Mirandola and  Marsilio Ficino penned major commentaries. According to Ficino:

Contemporary interpretations
Some scholars (including Gregory Vlastos) believe that the third man argument is a "record of honest perplexity". Other scholars think that Plato means us to reject one of the premises that produces the infinite regress (namely, One-Over-Many, Self-Predication, or Non-Self-Partaking). But it is also possible to avoid the contradictions by rejecting Uniqueness and Purity (while accepting One-Over-Many, Self-Predication, and Non-Self-Partaking).

Texts and translations
 Burnet, J., Plato. Opera Vol. II (Oxford University Press, 1903).  (Greek with critical apparatus).
 Fowler, H. N., Plato Vol. IV (Harvard University Press, 1926). Loeb Classical Library 167.  (Greek and English)
 Zekl, H. G., Platon. Parmenides (Meiner Verlag, 1972).  (Greek and German)
 Allen, R. E., Plato's Parmenides, Revised Edition (Yale University Press, 1997).  (English with commentary)
 Cornford, F. M., Plato and Parmenides (Routledge, 1939).  (English with commentary)
 Gill, M. L. and Ryan, P., Plato: Parmenides (Hackett Publishing, 1996).  (English with notes)
 Scolnicov, S., Plato's Parmenides (University of California Press, 2003).  (English with commentary)
 Turnbull, R., The Parmenides and Plato's Late Philosophy (University of Toronto Press, 1998).  (English with commentary)

See also
 Phaedrus
 Theaetetus
 Sophist
 Philebus
 Hylomorphism
 Harold F. Cherniss, Plato scholar, defended Plato against the Third man argument

References

Sources
 Bechtle, Gerald (ed.) An anonymous commentary on Plato's Parmenides. Oxford 1996.
 Cherniss, Harold: Parmenides and the Parmenides of Plato“, in: American Journal of Philology 53, 1932, pp. 122–138.
 
 Graeser, A. Prolegomena zu einer Interpretation des zweiten Teils des Platonischen Parmenides. Bern: Haupt, 1999.
 Graeser, Andreas: Platons Parmenides, Akademie der Wissenschaften und der Literatur, Mainz 2003
 Halfwassen, Jens: Der Aufstieg zum Einen: Untersuchungen zu Platon und Plotin, K.G. Saur Verlag, 2006.
 Klibansky, Raymond. "Plato’s Parmenides in the Middle Ages and the Renaissance: A Chapter in the History of Platonic Studies," Medieval and Renaissance Studies 1 (1941–3), 281–335.
 Kraut, Richard (eds). The Cambridge Companion to Plato. Cambridge. New York 1992.
 Lünstroth, Margarete: Teilhaben und Erleiden in Platons Parmenides. Untersuchungen zum Gebrauch von μετέχειν und πάσχειν Edition Ruprecht, Göttingen 2006, 
 Malmsheimer, Arne: Platons Parmenides und Marsilio Ficinos Parmenides-Kommentar. Ein kritischer Vergleich (= Bochumer Studien zur Philosophie, Bd. 34), Amsterdam 2001.  online.
Matía Cubillo, G. Ó., "Suggestions on How to Combine the Platonic Forms to Overcome the Interpretative Difficulties of Parmenides Dialogue", Revista de Filosofía de la Universidad de Costa Rica, vol. 60, n. 156, 2021, pp. 156–171. .
 Meinwald, Constance. "Goodbye to the Third Man" in Kraut pp. 365–396.
 Miller, Mitchell H. Jr. Plato's Parmenides: The Conversion of the Soul. Princeton 1986.
 Morrow, G.R., Dillon, J.M. (trs.), Proclus' commentary on Plato's Parmenides. Princeton University Press, 1987.
 Rickless, Samuel C.: Plato's forms in transition. A reading of the Parmenides, Cambridge 2007. 
 Ryle, Gilbert: „Plato's Parmenides“, in: Mind 48, 1939, pp. 129–51, 303–25.
 Suhr, Martin: Platons Kritik an den Eleaten. Vorschläge zur Interpretation des platonischen Dialogs ‚Parmenides‘, Hamburg, 1969.
 Turner, John D., Kevin Corrigan (ed.), Plato's Parmenides and Its Heritage, Volume 1: History and Interpretation from the Old Academy to later Platonism and Gnosticism. Writings from the Greco-Roman World Supplements 2. Atlanta: Society of Biblical Literature, 2010.
 Zekl, Hans Günter: Der Parmenides, N.G. Elwert Verlag, Marburg/Lahn, 1971.

Further reading 
 Allen, R. E., 1997, Plato’s Parmenides, revised edition. New Haven: Yale University Press.
 Chen, C. H., 1944, ‘On the Parmenides of Plato’, Classical Quarterly, 38: 101–114.
 Cherniss, H., 1944, Aristotle’s Criticism of Plato and the Academy, Baltimore: Johns Hopkins Press.
 Cornford, F. M., 1939, Plato and Parmenides, London: Routledge and Kegan Paul.
 Fine, G., 1993, On Ideas: Aristotle’s Criticism of Plato’s Theory of Forms, Oxford: Clarendon Press.
 Fine, G. (ed.), 2008, The Oxford Handbook to Plato, New York: Oxford University Press.
 Gill, M. L., 2012, Philosophos: Plato’s Missing Dialogue, Oxford: Oxford University Press.
 Gill, C., and McCabe, M. M. (ed.), 1996, Form and Argument in Late Plato, Oxford: Clarendon Press.
 Gill, M. L., and Ryan, P. (ed.), 1996, Plato: Parmenides, Indianapolis: Hackett.
 Grote, G., 1865, Plato and the Other Companions of Sokrates (Volume II), London: John Murray.
 Havlicek, A., and Karfik, F., 2005, Plato’s Parmenides: Proceedings of the Fourth Symposium Platonicum Pragense, Prague: OIKOYMENH Publishers.
 Hermann, A., 2012, ‘Plato’s Eleatic Challenge and the Problem of Self-Predication in the Parmenides’, Presocratics and Plato: Festschrift at Delphi in Honor of Charles Kahn, Las Vegas: Parmenides Publishing, 205–232.
 Hermann, A., and Chrysakopoulou, S., 2010, Plato’s Parmenides: Text, Translation, and Introductory Essay, Las Vegas: Parmenides Publishing.
 Karasmanis, V., 2012, ‘Dialectic and the Second Part of Plato’s Parmenides’, Presocratics and Plato: Festschrift at Delphi in Honor of Charles Kahn, Las Vegas: Parmenides Publishing, 183–203.
 Kraut, R. (ed.), 1992, The Cambridge Companion to Plato, Cambridge: Cambridge University Press.
 Malcolm, J., 1991, Plato on the Self-Predication of Forms: Early and Middle Dialogues, Oxford: Clarendon Press.
 Matthews, G., 1972, Plato’s Epistemology and Related Logical Problems, London: Faber.
 McCabe, M. M., 1994, Plato’s Individuals, Princeton: Princeton University Press.
 Meinwald, C. C., 1991, Plato’s Parmenides, New York: Oxford University Press.
 Miller, M. H. Jr., 1986, Plato’s Parmenides: The Conversion of the Soul, Princeton: Princeton University Press.
 Rickless, S. C., 2007, Plato’s Forms in Transition: A Reading of the Parmenides, Cambridge: Cambridge University Press.
 Robinson, R., 1953, Plato’s Earlier Dialectic, 2nd edition, Oxford: Clarendon Press.
 Ross, W. D., 1953, Plato’s Theory of Ideas, 2nd edition, Oxford: Clarendon Press.
 Sanday, E. C., 2015, A Study of Dialectic in Plato’s Parmenides, Evanston: Northwestern University Press.
 Scolnicov, S., 2003, Plato’s Parmenides, Berkeley: University of California Press.
 Tabak, M., 2015, Plato’s Parmenides Reconsidered, New York: Palgrave Macmillan.
 Teloh, H., 1981, The Development of Plato’s Metaphysics, University Park: Pennsylvania State University Press.
 Teloh, H., and Louzecky, D. J., 1972, ‘Plato’s Third Man Argument’, Phronesis, 17: 80–94.

External links

 
 Plato: Parmenides at MIT Internet Classics Archive
 Plato: Parmenides at Project Gutenberg
 Plato's Parmenides and the Dilemma of Participation with an annotated bibliography

 Plato's Parmenides translated by Benjamin Jowett (Internet Archive, 1892: text 45)
 

Dialogues of Plato